Bostrom High School (also known as Bostrom Alternative Center, is an alternative high school that is part of the Phoenix Union High School District in Phoenix, Arizona.

History 
Bostrom High was established in 1976.

Student population 
The school is available for 10th, 11th, and 12th grade students who reside within the PUHSD, but some 9th grade students are also admitted, during the spring semester.

Students are selected or admitted based on an application and interview process, and parents must attend a mandatory orientation.

As of the 2016-2017 school year, there are 230 students at Bostrom. According to Arizona Department of Education figures in the 2014-2015 school year, the school's graduation rate is only 27%.

References

External links
 Bostrom High School
 Phoenix Union High School District website
 Arizona Department of Education School Report Card
 Facebook
 Twitter

Public high schools in Arizona
Educational institutions established in 1976
High schools in Phoenix, Arizona